Terrance Hamlin, better known as 9th Prince, is an American rapper and one of the founding members of rap group Killarmy.  He was initially responsible for bringing the various members together, under the guide of his brother. He released his solo debut album Granddaddy Flow in 2003. He is the younger brother of RZA. He went by the alias Madman & Iron Fingers, especially in his early recordings. 9th Prince gets his name from the kung-fu movie Shaolin Prince. He has pushed hard for a reunion album with his group, and helped to release a 'greatest hits' album.

Discography

Solo 
(2003) Grandaddy Flow
(2008) Prince of New York
(2010) Revenge of the 9th Prince
(2010) One Man Army
(2011) Salute the General EP
(2018) The Madman's Revenge EP

With Killarmy 
(1997) Silent Weapons for Quiet Wars
 Singles: "Swinging Swords," "Camouflage Ninjas"/"Wake Up,""Wu-Renegades"/"Clash of the Titans"
(1998) Dirty Weaponry
 Singles: "Red Dawn"/"Where I Rest At," "The Shoot-Out"
(2001) Fear, Love & War
 Singles: "Street Monopoly"/"Monster," "Feel It"/"Militant,""Nonchalantly"
(2011) Greatest Hits
(2020) Full Metal Jackets
Singles: "Musical Terrorist", "The Shoot-Out Pt. II"

Guest appearances 
Gravediggaz Goin' On (featuring 9th Prince and Blue Raspberry) The Pick, the Sickle and the Shovel 1997
RZA Fuck What You Think (featuring 9th Prince and Islord) Bobby Digital In Stereo 1998
Cilvaringz Valentine's Day Massacre (featuring 9th Prince, 60 Second Assassin, Shabazz the Disciple and Blue Raspberry) I (Cilvaringz album) 2007
RZA Number One Samurai (Afro Season II Outro) (performed by 9th Prince) The RZA Presents: Afro Samurai Resurrection OST 2009
Caper Lords of Mayhem (featuring 9th Prince and Shutterworth) Lords of Chaos 2017

Videography 
Sunz of Man || 12" Single || Soldiers of Darkness (featuring Killarmy and various Wu-Tang Clan cameos || 1995 Wu-Tang Records)
Killarmy || Silent Weapons for Quiet Wars || Swinging SwordsWake Up (featuring Hell Razah, Prodigal Sunn and various Wu-Tang Clan cameos)Wu-Renegades (featuring various Wu-Tang Clan cameos) || 1997 Loud/Priority/Wu-Tang Records
Killarmy || Dirty Weaponry || The Shoot-Out (featuring Rza) || 1998 Wu-Tang Records
Killarmy || Fear, Love & War || Feel It || 2001

References 

Wu-Tang Clan affiliates
African-American male rappers
American male rappers
Rappers from New York City
Living people
1970s births
East Coast hip hop musicians
People from Staten Island
Killarmy members
20th-century American rappers
21st-century American rappers
Year of birth missing (living people)